The Dutch symphonic metal/rock band Within Temptation has released four video albums and has appeared in twenty-nine music videos and three short films. From their first EP, The Dance (1998), they released an animated music video for the song "The Dance". The first live action video came after the release of their second album, Mother Earth (2000), for their national hit single Ice Queen (2001). The single generated two videos, the second one coming only two years later, in order to give the song a better worked music video due to the single newfound international rotation. The second version was directed by frequent heavy metal video director Patric Ullaeus, who had already worked with the band for their Mother Earth video.

Besides their music videos, the band has released four video albums and appeared in several television shows, mainly in their home country.

Music videos 

 A The main music videos are attached to their respective short-films.
 B There are two versions of the video, one featuring Dave Pirner as guest and the other featuring Piotr Rogucki. The storyline, although, is composed by the same scenes.
 C Although Shaddix appears on the song, he is absent from the music video.

Video albums

Short films

Television

Filmography

References 

Videography
Music videographies